Sana Amin Sheikh (born 10 August 1989) is an Indian actress and radio jockey, who appears mainly in Hindi television shows and films. Sana made her acting debut with Kya Mast Hai Life playing Ritu Shah. She has appeared in over 30 television serials, and has established herself among the most popular Television stars.

Sana has played lead roles in shows including Jeet Jayenge Hum, Gustakh Dil, Million Dollar Girl, Bhootu Season 1, Krishnadasi and Perfect Pati among others. She played Antagonist/Supporting role in shows like Kuch Rang Pyar Ke Aise Bhi 3, Tere Shehar Mein, Mann Kee Awaaz Pratigya. 

Amin made her Bollywood debut with Singham as Anjali Bhosle and has also played supporting parts in Table No. 21 , Island City and Bamfaad.

Early life
Sana is from Mumbai. Her great-grandfather, Ashraf Khan, was an actor and a singer in Gujarati theatre, and played the narrator in filmmaker Mehboob Khan's film Roti.

Personal life
She was married to television director Aijaz Sheikh from 2016 to 2022.

Career
Sheikh is working as an RJ in Radio Mirchi 98.3 FM since August 2004. Whilst listening to Mirchi one day in class, she heard an RJ inviting listeners to audition to be a radio jockey. After a successful audition, she was immediately asked to join the station as an RJ. She hosted a show 'Khoobsurat, Sana ke saath and 'TRP – Television Radio Par 
RJ with Mirchi Love and Ishq FM.

Sheikh began acting as a child artist and played the lead role of young Savi in Hasratein on Zee TV and played the character of Vaishali in the serial Junoon on DD channel in 1995. She emerged again in 2009 and gained fame for playing one of the leads Ritu Shah on the Disney Channel India Original Series, Kya Mast Hai Life. She then played lead the role of Suman as the lead actress in the television serial Jeet Jayenge Hum, which was aired on Sony Entertainment Television (India). Another drama series she took part in, once again being the lead actress, was Zee television's Mera Naam Karegi Roshan, as Reet. She has been a part of the famous Star Plus drama Mann Kee Awaaz Pratigya, performing the role of Ganga.She was seen playing a negative role in Colors' Sasural Simar Ka as Naina for a few episodes and then was seen as a lead girl again in life OK's Gustakh Dil. She made her Bollywood debut in Rohit Shetty's Singham. She also worked in Channel V's Million Dollar Girl as the lead character Avanti Bansal.
She played lead role of Aradhya in Colors TV's popular show Krishnadasi. She played the lead as Shuchi Sharma in the serial Bhootu''.

Filmography

Television

Films

See also

List of Indian film actresses

References

External links

RJ Sana at Radio Mirchi

Living people
Indian television actresses
Actresses from Mumbai
Indian women radio presenters
Indian radio presenters
Indian soap opera actresses
Actresses in Hindi cinema
Indian film actresses
21st-century Indian actresses
Actresses in Hindi television
20th-century Indian women writers
20th-century Indian writers
1989 births